Argyrotaenia santacatarinae is a species of moth of the family Tortricidae. It is found in Santa Catarina, Brazil.

The wingspan is 14–17 mm. The ground colour of the forewings is dark greyish brown, scaled grey and with brown-grey markings with blackish brown marginal marks. The hindwings are dark brown.

Etymology
The species name refers to the type locality, the state of Santa Catarina.

References

S
Endemic fauna of Brazil
Moths of South America
Tortricidae of South America
Moths described in 2010